Weber's thick-toed gecko (Pachydactylus weberi) is a species of lizard in the family Gekkonidae. The species is native to southern Africa.

Etymology
The specific name, weberi, is in honor of German-Dutch zoologist Max Wilhelm Carl Weber van Bosse.

Geographic range
P. weberi is found in Namibia and South Africa.

Habitat

Description
P. weberi is small for its genus, flattened, and slender-bodied.

Behavior
P. weberi is nocturnal. During the day it shelters in rock crevices.

Diet
P. weberi predominantly preys upon moths and spiders.

Reproduction
P. weberi is oviparous. The adult female lays a clutch of two hard-shelled eggs. Each egg measures on average 9.5 mm x 6.5 mm (0.37 in x 0.26 in).

References

Further reading
Bauer AM, Lamb T, Branch WR (2006). "A revision of the Pachydactylus serval and P. weberi groups (Reptilia: Gekkota: Gekkonidae) of Southern Africa, with the description of eight new species". Proceedings of the California Academy of Sciences, Fourth Series 57 (23): 595–709. (Pachydactylus weberi, pp. 606–610 + Figures 1, 3, 13–20).
Rösler H (2000). "Kommentierte Liste der rezent, subrezent und fossil bekannten Geckotaxa (Reptilia: Gekkonomorpha)". Gekkota 2: 28–153. (Pachydactylus weberi, p. 99). (in German).
Roux J (1907). "Beiträge zur Kenntnis der Fauna von Süd-Afrika. Ergebnisse einer Reise von Prof. Max Weber im Jahre 1894. VII. Lacertilia (Eidechsen)". Zoologische Jahrbücher. Abteilung für Systematik, Geographie und Biologie der Tiere 25: 403–444. (Pachydactylus weberi, new species, pp. 408–410 + Plate 14, figures 4–5). (in German).

Pachydactylus
Reptiles of South Africa
Reptiles of Namibia
Reptiles described in 1907